State Route 62 (SR 62) is a  west-to-east highway in the U.S. state of Tennessee. It is designated as a primary route except for the short segment between SR 169 and its eastern terminus, which is secondary.

State Route 62 begins in Putnam County at State Route 84; it ends in Knox County at U.S. Route 441/State Route 33.

Route description

Putnam and Fentress counties

SR 62 begins in Putnam County in downtown Monterey as a primary highway at an intersection with SR 84 and SR 164. It then heads east (as East Commercial Avenue) through downtown before leaving Monterey (as Clarkrange Highway) as a two-lane highway to parallel I-40 for a short distance before going through forested areas and the community of Muddy Pond before crossing into Fentress County.

SR 62 immediately enters farmland and goes down a fertile valley to enter Clarkrange and junction with US 127/SR 28. The highway now leaves Clarkrange (as Deer Lodge Highway) and continues east through farmland and crosses into Morgan County.

Morgan and Roane counties

In Morgan County, SR 62 enters the Eastern Time Zone, leaving farmland and becoming very curvy (and becoming Nashville Highway) as it heads east through the mountains of the Cumberland Plateau. It passes through Chestnut Ridge before it intersects the southern end of SR 329 south of Deer Lodge and continues east to intersect with SR 298. SR 62 continues eastward and goes through Lancing and becomes even curvier, before coming to an intersection with US 27/SR 29 (Morgan County Highway) north of Wartburg. It becomes concurrent with US 27/SR 29 and widens into a four-lane highway before entering Wartburg. They then pass just east of downtown before SR 62 separates from US 27/SR 29 and continues southeast (as Knoxville Highway) as a four-lane and then exits Wartburg. SR 62 continues southeast and narrows to a two-lane before entering Joyner. The highway continues through Joyner, which is mainly farmland, and then junctions with SR 116 west of Petros before entering Stephens. It goes through Stephens and then goes through a short mountain pass (locally known as Stephens Mountain) before passing through Coalfield to enter Oliver Springs and crosses into Roane County.

SR 62 almost immediately has an intersection between SR 61 (Tri County Boulevard/Harvey H. Hannah Memorial Highway) and SR 330, with it becoming concurrent with SR 61. They then bypasses downtown to the north and east as a four-lane and enters Anderson County.

Anderson and Knox counties

The highway continues through Oliver Springs and then Separates from SR 61 and enters Oak Ridge (as Illinois Avenue). In Oak Ridge, SR 62 has a junction with SR 95 before widening to a six-lane and going through a major business district, passing by the Oak Ridge City Center (Mall), before downgrading to a four-lane at an interchange with Centrifuge way. The highway continues to an interchanges with Bethel Valley Road, which provides access to the Y-12 National Security Complex, and SR 170 before leaving Oak Ridge and crossing the Clinch River/Melton Hill Lake, crossing into Knox County and entering Solway.

SR 62 goes through Solway (as Oak Ridge Highway) and has partial interchange with SR 162 (Pellisippi Parkway) before leaving Solway and narrowing to a two-lane. It then passes through Karns and junctions with SR 131 before entering Knoxville, widening to a four-lane (and becoming Western Avenue). SR 62 continues through North Knoxville before widening to a six-lane and having an interchange with I-640/I-75. The highway  narrows to a two-lane for short distance before widening back out to a four-lane and intersecting SR 169. SR 62 then turns secondary and has an interchange with I-40/I-275 before entering downtown and ending at an intersection with US 441/SR 33.

Junction list

See also

References

Tennessee Department of Transportation (January 24, 2003). "State Highway and Interstate List 2003".

External links

Tennessee Department of Transportation

062
Transportation in Putnam County, Tennessee
Transportation in Fentress County, Tennessee
Transportation in Morgan County, Tennessee
Transportation in Roane County, Tennessee
Transportation in Anderson County, Tennessee
Transportation in Knox County, Tennessee
Transportation in Knoxville, Tennessee